Ramnagar is a neighborhood situated on the central part of Visakhapatnam City, India. The area, which falls under the local administrative limits of Greater Visakhapatnam Municipal Corporation. Ramnagar is located near Dwaraka Nagar, Asilmetta and Daba Gardens.

About
Ramnagar is one of the more important commercial areas in the city and includes all Greater Visakhapatnam Municipal Corporation Administrative buildings. The waltair main road near Ramnagar has many businesses for clothing, kitchen appliances and utensils, shoes, toys, gifts and merchandise. There are also a few restaurants, hotels, as well as bakeries.

Hospitals
There are many corporate hospitals available here. They are Seven Hills Hospitals, Apollo Heart Centre, Lazarus Hospitals and OMNI RK hospitals.

Transport
Ramnagar is connected with MVP and the old town.

APSRTC routes

References

Neighbourhoods in Visakhapatnam